is a Japanese manga series written and illustrated by Ao Akato. It was serialized in Kodansha's seinen manga magazine Evening from January 2017 to January 2018, with its chapters collected in three tankōbon volumes.

Publication
Riū wo Machinagara is written and illustrated by Ao Akato. It was serialized in Kodansha's seinen manga magazine Evening from January 10, 2017 to January 23, 2018. Kodansha collected chapters in three tankōbon volumes, released from June 23, 2017 to March 23, 2018.

In France, the manga has been licensed by Kana, which published it under the title Contamination.

Volume list

See also
In Hand — Another manga series by the same author.

References

Further reading

External links
 

Kodansha manga
Medical anime and manga
Seinen manga
Suspense anime and manga